2 Corinthians 1 is the first chapter of the Second Epistle to the Corinthians in the New Testament of the Christian Bible. It is authored by Paul the Apostle and Timothy (2 Corinthians 1:1) in Macedonia in 55–56 CE.

Text
The original text was written in Koine Greek. This chapter is divided into 24 verses.

Textual witnesses
Some early manuscripts containing the text of this chapter are:
Papyrus 46 (~AD 200)
Codex Vaticanus (325–350)
Codex Sinaiticus (330–360)
Codex Alexandrinus (400–440; complete)
Codex Ephraemi Rescriptus (~450; extant verses 3–24)
Codex Freerianus (~450; extant verses 1, 9, 16–17)
Codex Claromontanus (~550)

Greetings

Verse 1
 Paul, an apostle of Jesus Christ by the will of God, and Timothy our brother,
To the church of God which is at Corinth, with all the saints who are in all Achaia: (NKJV)
Timothy's name is also associated with Paul's name in the Epistles to the Philippians, Colossians, both of those written to the Thessalonians, and in that to Philemon.

Preface

Sparing the Church
Paul outlines his aborted plans to travel to Corinth on his way to Macedonia, return to Corinth and then travel to Judea. The letter does not indicate where he is writing from, or would have been travelling from. Easton's Bible Dictionary suggests "it was probably written at Philippi, or, as some think, Thessalonica".

Verse 20
For all the promises of God in Him are Yes, and in Him Amen, to the glory of God through us.

"All the promises of God in Him are Yes" ("yea" in King James Version): the first 5 words may be rendered, "as many promises of God", and these promises are all "in" Christ, with and in whom they were made. Moreover, these promises are "in Him [are] yea".
"And in Him Amen": that is, like Christ himself, who is "the amen, the true and faithful witness, the same today, yesterday, and for ever."
"The glory of God through us": When the promises are received "by us", the believers in Christ, the more glory is given to God. The Syriac version has the "Amen" in the last clause, reading: "therefore by him we give Amen to the glory of God".

Verse 21

Now the one who establishes us together with you in Christ and who anoints us is God,

Verse 22
who also has sealed us and given us the Spirit in our hearts as a guarantee. 
Cross reference: Ephesians 1:13

See also 
 Achaia
 Jesus Christ
 Judea
 Macedonia
 Paul of Tarsus
 Silvanus
 Timothy
 Other related Bible parts: 1 Corinthians 1, Revelation 3

References

Sourcesd

External links 
 King James Bible - Wikisource
English Translation with Parallel Latin Vulgate
Online Bible at GospelHall.org (ESV, KJV, Darby, American Standard Version, Bible in Basic English)
Multiple bible versions at Bible Gateway (NKJV, NIV, NRSV etc.)

01